St Mary's Church is in St Mary's Street, Crewe, Cheshire, England.  It is an active Roman Catholic parish church in the diocese of Shrewsbury.  The church is recorded in the National Heritage List for England as a designated Grade II listed building.

History

The church was built between 1890 and 1891, the tower being completed at a later date.  The architects were Pugin and Pugin.

Architecture

Exterior
St Mary's is constructed in red brick with red sandstone dressings, and a slate roof.  Its architectural style is Decorated.  The plan consists of a five-bay nave with a clerestory, north and south aisles, a chancel with an apse, and a southwest tower.  The tower has angle buttresses, and a pyramidal roof with lucarnes.  In the bottom stage are windows with Geometrical tracery, in the stage above are niches containing statues and flanked by lancet windows, and above these are paired lancets.  The top stage contains louvred bell openings.  The chancel and the gable of the nave contain windows with Geometrical tracery, the windows along the sides of the aisles have Perpendicular tracery, and the clerestory windows are paired quatrefoils.

Interior
Inside the church the arcades are carried on octagonal piers.  The stone reredos has much gilding and is decorated with Gothic motifs.  The baldacchino is supported by marble shafts.  The main altar is flanked by side altars, and there are more altars at the east ends of the aisles.  These are all separated from the nave by a marble communion rail.  The organ dates from 1897 and was built by Gray and Davison.

See also

Listed buildings in Crewe

References

External links

Roman Catholic churches in Cheshire
Grade II listed churches in Cheshire
Roman Catholic churches completed in 1891
Gothic Revival church buildings in England
Gothic Revival architecture in Cheshire
Roman Catholic Diocese of Shrewsbury
19th-century Roman Catholic church buildings in the United Kingdom